Virgin Green Fund was established in 2007 to invest in companies in the renewable energy and resource efficiency sectors in the US and Europe. It closed in 2014.

Investment history
The fund's first fundraising round raised $199m from Virgin and other investors. A notable initial investor was Wolverhampton City Council. The fund's investment focus is on established businesses rather than start ups. It had invested in 10 businesses out of 3,700 considered as of 2010.

Portfolio 
As of April 2010 Virgin Green Fund's portfolio included:
 Gevo
 Solyndra
 Odersun
 Metrolight
 Wildcat Discovery Technologies
 DuraTherm
 Seven Seas
 Quench USA
 GreenRoad

Shutdown 
In 2014, the firm was closed down  by the Virgin Group.

See also 
Virgin Atlantic
Aviation biofuel
Sustainable aviation fuel

References

Further reading 
Virgin Green Fund leads Odersun funding round.
Benchmark, Branson Keep Eyes on Cleantech Road.
"Gevo Licenses UCLA Technology " – Gevo has received investments from Khosla Ventures and Virgin Green Fund.

External links 
 

Bioenergy organizations
G